Dayle Grubb (born 24 July 1991) is an English professional footballer who plays for Weston-super-Mare as a central midfielder.

Career
Grubb came through the academy at Weston-super-Mare, and worked as a sports teacher during a nine-year stay with the "Seagulls". On 5 December 2017, he signed an 18-month contract with EFL League Two side Forest Green Rovers after scoring 29 goals during the calendar year of 2017; the transfer was confirmed for an undisclosed fee on 1 January. He moved on loan to Eastleigh in February 2020. He left Forest Green Rovers at the end of the 2019–20 season following the expiry of his contract. He returned to Weston-super-Mare in August 2020.

Career statistics

References

1991 births
Living people
English footballers
Association football midfielders
Weston-super-Mare A.F.C. players
Forest Green Rovers F.C. players
National League (English football) players
English Football League players
Schoolteachers from Gloucestershire
People from Weston-super-Mare
Eastleigh F.C. players
Southern Football League players